Malaysia participated at the 2017 Asian Youth Para Games which was held in Dubai, United Arab Emirates from 10 to 14 December 2017. Malaysia contingent had 12 athletes competed in five sports and was led by chef de mission, Siti Zaharah Abdul Khalid.

Malaysia won five gold, one silver and two bronze medal, placing 15th among 30 nations.

Medalists

Athletics 
Five sportspeople competed in athletics for the Malaysia:

Eddy Bernard
Jacklon Ganding
S. Thavanesvaran
Muhammad Zulhaizat Zainal Abidin
Felicia Mikat

Badminton 
Malaysia had a sole competitor in badminton

Muhammad Zulfatihi Jaafar.

Powerlifting 
Two players took part in the powerlifting for the Malaysia.
Wan Nur Azri Wan Azman
Siti Nuraisyah Sahrin

Swimming 
Malaysia had a sole competitor in swimming

Carmen Lim.

Table tennis 
Three players took part in the table tennis for the Malaysia.
Chee Chaoming
Ahmad Syahir Kamal Saupi
Gloria Gracia Wong Sze

See also 
 Malaysia at the 2017 Asian Indoor and Martial Arts Games
 Malaysia at the 2017 ASEAN Para Games

References 

Malaysia 2017
Asian Youth Para Games, 2017
Asian Youth Para Games